Better Living TV Theater was an early American television program originally broadcast on ABC and later on the now defunct DuMont Television Network. The documentary series, featuring moderator Fischer Black, ran from 1953 to 1954. The ABC version was a summer replacement series which aired on Sunday afternoons. The final ABC broadcast occurred on August 16, 1953.

On April 21, 1954, the DuMont Network began to air the series in prime time. Better Living TV Theater aired on Wednesday nights at 10:30 pm EST, until June, when the program was moved to Sunday nights. The final broadcast was on August 29, 1954.

Episode status
One episode of this series survives at the Paley Center for Media.

See also
List of programs broadcast by the DuMont Television Network
List of surviving DuMont Television Network broadcasts

References

Bibliography
David Weinstein, The Forgotten Network: DuMont and the Birth of American Television (Philadelphia: Temple University Press, 2004) 
Alex McNeil, Total Television, Fourth edition (New York: Penguin Books, 1980) 
Tim Brooks and Earle Marsh, The Complete Directory to Prime Time Network TV Shows, Third edition (New York: Ballantine Books, 1964)

External links

DuMont historical website

DuMont Television Network original programming
American Broadcasting Company original programming
Black-and-white American television shows
English-language television shows
1953 American television series debuts
1954 American television series endings